Makuta is a village in Central District of Botswana. It is located 70 km north-west of Francistown, along the road connecting Francistown to Tutume. The population was 1,295 in 2001 census.

References

Populated places in Central District (Botswana)
Villages in Botswana